is a Japanese tokusatsu series that aired on TV Asahi from January 10 to March 28, 2002. The series featured Kohei Murakami as Chrono Investigator Kent Kiba, who would later star in Kamen Rider 555 as Masato Kusaka/Kamen Rider Kaixa.

Theme song

Lyrics: Tetsuhiko Suzuki
Composition: expo
Arrangement: Naoki Yamada, Uni Inoue
Artist: Mariko Kōda

External links
Jikuu Keisatsu Wecker D-02 at Generalworks 

2002 Japanese television series debuts
2002 Japanese television series endings
Tokusatsu television series
TV Asahi original programming